Jiří Kaufman (born 28 November 1979) is a retired Czech football striker who formerly played for Erzgebirge Aue and Czech second division side Hradec Králové. He has played for the Czech Republic national under-21 football team.

References

External links 
 
 
 

1979 births
Living people
Czech footballers
Czech Republic youth international footballers
Czech Republic under-21 international footballers
Czech First League players
FK Drnovice players
FC Hradec Králové players
Bohemians 1905 players
Hannover 96 players
FC Energie Cottbus players
Karlsruher SC players
FC Erzgebirge Aue players
AFK Atlantic Lázně Bohdaneč players
Bundesliga players
2. Bundesliga players
Czech expatriate sportspeople in Germany
Expatriate footballers in Germany
Sportspeople from Pardubice
Association football forwards